Double ka meetha (also known as Shahi Tukra, is an Indian bread pudding sweet made of fried bread slices soaked in hot milk with spices, including saffron and cardamom. Double ka meetha is a dessert of Hyderabad. It is popular in Hyderabadi cuisine, served at weddings and parties. Double ka meetha refers to the milk bread, called "double roti" in the local Indian dialects because it swells up to almost double its original size after baking.

See also
 Qubani ka meetha

References

External links

Recipe for Double ka Meetha
Double ka meetha

Indian desserts
Indian cuisine
Telangana cuisine
Hyderabadi cuisine
Muhajir cuisine
Wedding food
Milk dishes
Bread puddings
Dried fruit